Evelyne Schneider (married name: Rossoukhi; born 23 February 1950 in Waidhofen an der Ybbs, Lower Austria) is an Austrian former pair skater. With partner Wilhelm Bietak, she represented Austria at the 1968 Winter Olympics, where they placed 15th.

Competitive highlights

With Bietak

With Dedovich

References

Navigation

1950 births
Living people
People from Waidhofen an der Ybbs
Austrian female pair skaters
Olympic figure skaters of Austria
Figure skaters at the 1968 Winter Olympics
Universiade medalists in figure skating
Universiade bronze medalists for Austria
Competitors at the 1970 Winter Universiade
Sportspeople from Lower Austria